Curse II: The Bite (also known simply as The Bite) is a 1989 Italian-American horror film directed by Frederico Prosperi, credited as Fred Goodwin. It is the second entry into the Curse tetralogy, a rebranding of unrelated films for marketing purposes.

Plot
Two young lovers, Clark (J. Eddie Peck) and Lisa (Jill Schoelen) are traveling through the desert in New Mexico when they unwittingly pass through an abandoned nuclear test site which has become a breeding ground for deadly mutant killer snakes. When the car breaks down and Clark is bitten, despite the best efforts from Harry Morton (Jamie Farr) and the local sheriff (Bo Svenson), he undergoes a grotesque transformation into a hideous snake monster, which eventually begins to consume him. The sheriff and his deputies must track Clark in order to rescue Lisa and destroy the monster once and for all.

Production
After the success of The Curse, producer Ovidio G. Assonitis and his company TriHoof Investments began production on The Bite and The Train. The Bite was originally written by Susan Zealouf and Frederico Prosperi was hired to direct. Prosperi had previously produced The Wild Beasts in 1984 which had used a lot of animal effects. As of 2020, Curse II: The Bite is his only directorial effort. The movie was filmed in Las Cruces, New Mexico. The special effects were created by noted artist Screaming Mad George.

Release
After the film was completed, the film was retitled Curse II: The Bite by the American distributors, who had also bought the right to Beyond the Door III. The film was retitled to capitalize on the success of The Curse. The film was released on VHS and Laserdisc in 1989 by Trans World Entertainment. In 2016, the film was released on a double-feature Blu-ray together with The Curse.

Sequels
The film was a success on home media and in 1991 Curse III: Blood Sacrifice was released direct-to-video. The film starring Jenilee Harrison and Christopher Lee was originally titled Panga. When Catacombs (1988) was released on VHS in 1993, it was given the title Curse IV: The Ultimate Sacrifice, despite not being affiliated with the series. Ovidio G. Assonitis was not associated with either of the later projects.

References 

1980s monster movies
1989 horror films
1989 films
American monster movies
Italian horror films
1980s English-language films
1980s American films
1980s Italian films
Films scored by Carlo Maria Cordio